Lutomiersk  is a town in Pabianice County, Łódź Voivodeship, in central Poland. It is the seat of the gmina (administrative district) called Gmina Lutomiersk.

The town has an approximate population of 2,000.

History
Lutomiersk was granted town rights in 1274 by Duke Leszek II the Black from the Piast dynasty.

During the German occupation of Poland (World War II), in 1940, the occupiers carried out expulsions of Poles, who were placed in a transit camp in Łódź, and then deported to the General Government in the more eastern part of German-occupied Poland, while their houses and farms were handed over to German colonists as part of the Lebensraum policy. A local Polish teacher was among the victims of a massacre of Poles from the region perpetrated by the Germans in 1939 in nearby Łagiewniki (present-day district of Łódź).

Transport
Lutomiersk has a tram connection to Łódź via Konstantynów Łódzki. This is line 43 going every hour and supported by "MPK Lodz". There are also 2 bus lines: Łódź (Independence Square) - Konstantynów Łódzki - Lutomiersk and Pabianice - Lutomiersk.

References

Cities and towns in Łódź Voivodeship
Pabianice County
Piotrków Governorate
Łódź Voivodeship (1919–1939)